The President of the Bundestag presides over the sessions of the German parliament, the Bundestag. Since the introduction of the office in 1949, thirteen people held the office. President of the current 19th Bundestag is, since 24 October 2017, Wolfgang Schäuble (CDU).

List of
Political parties

{|class="wikitable" style="text-align:center; width:100%; border:1px #AAAAFF solid"
|-
!width=80px rowspan=2 colspan=2|Portrait
!width=30% rowspan=2|Name(Born–Died)
!width=35% colspan=3|Term of office
!width=28% rowspan=2|Political party
|-
!Took office
!Left office
!Days
|-
| style="background:; color:white;"  | 1
|
|Erich Köhler(1892–1958)
| 7 September 1949
| 18 October 1950
|
|Christian Democratic Union
|-
| style="background:; color:white;"  | 2
|
|Hermann Ehlers(1904–1954)
| 19 October 1950
| 29 October 1954
|
|Christian Democratic Union
|-
| style="background:; color:white;"  | 3
|
|Eugen Gerstenmaier(1906–1986)
| 16 November 1954
| 31 January 1969
|
|Christian Democratic Union
|-
| style="background:; color:white;"  | 4
|
|Kai-Uwe von Hassel(1913–1997)
| 5 February 1969
| 13 December 1972
|
|Christian Democratic Union
|-
| style="background:; color:white;"  | 5
|
|Annemarie Renger(1919–2008)
| 13 December 1972
| 14 December 1976
|
|Social Democratic Party
|-
| style="background:; color:white;"  | 6
|
|Karl Carstens(1914–1992)
| 14 December 1976
| 31 May 1979
|
|Christian Democratic Union
|-
| style="background:; color:white;"  | 7
|
|Richard Stücklen(1916–2002)
| 31 May 1979
| 29 March 1983
|
|Christian Democratic Union
|-
| style="background:; color:white;"  | 8
|
|Rainer Barzel(1924–2006)
| 29 March 1983
| 25 October 1984
|
|Christian Democratic Union
|-
| style="background:; color:white;"  | 9
|
|Philipp Jenninger(1932–2018)
| 5 November 1984
| 11 November 1988
|
|Christian Democratic Union
|-
| style="background:; color:white;"  | 10
|
|Rita Süssmuth(born 1937)
| 25 November 1988
| 26 October 1998
|
|Christian Democratic Union
|-
| style="background:; color:white;"  | 11
|
|Wolfgang Thierse(born 1943)
| 26 October 1998
| 18 October 2005
|
|Social Democratic Party
|-
| style="background:; color:white;"  | 12
|
|Norbert Lammert(born 1948)
| 18 October 2005
| 24 October 2017
|
|Christian Democratic Union
|-
| style="background:; color:white;"  | 13
|
|Wolfgang Schäuble(born 1942)
| 24 October 2017
| 26 October 2021
|
|Christian Democratic Union
|-
| style="background:; color:white;"  | 14
|
|Bärbel Bas(born 1968)
| 26 October 2021
|Incumbent
|
|Social Democratic Party
|}

External links
 

ReferencesWeb citiationsBooks'''
 

 
Bundestag
Bundestag